Two Mermaid-class destroyers served with the Royal Navy during the First World War. They were three-funnelled turtle-backed destroyers with the usual Hawthorn funnel tops.

Their Thornycroft boilers produced 6,100 hp to given them the required  and they were armed with the standard 12-pounder gun and two torpedo tubes.  They carried a complement of 63 officers and men. In 1913 the pair - like all other surviving three-funnelled destroyers of the "30-knotter" group - were reclassed as s. The almost identical  ships built subsequently at the same yard differed only by having Yarrow boilers.

References

 

Destroyer classes
 
Ship classes of the Royal Navy